Sir David Michael Bean (born 25 March 1954) is a British judge of the Court of Appeal of England and Wales.

Early life and education
David Bean was born on 25 March 1954, the son of High Court judge Sir George Bean. He was educated at St Paul's School, an all-boys private school in Barnes, London. He studied law at Trinity Hall, Cambridge, graduating from the University of Cambridge with a Bachelor of Arts (BA) degree.

Legal career
On 29 July 1976, David Bean was called to the bar at Middle Temple, In 1997, he was appointed a Queen's Counsel (QC). He was appointed a bencher by Middle Temple on 6 March 2001. In 2002, he was Chairman of the General Council of the Bar, the professional association for barristers in England and Wales.
He became Deputy Treasurer of the Middle Temple in 2018.

Judiciary
In 1992, Bean was appointed an Assistant Recorder. On 11 March 1996, he was appointed as a Recorder on the South Eastern Circuit.

On 19 July 2004, Bean was appointed a judge of the High Court of Justice (Queen's Bench Division) and received the customary knighthood. From 2007 to 2010, he served as the presiding judge of the South Eastern Circuit. From October 2010 to March 2014, he was a Commissioner of the Judicial Appointments Commission, the body that selects candidates for judicial office.

In 2010, Mr Justice Bean presided over the trial of Jon Venables who had been accused of downloading and distributing indecent images of children. Venables was found guilty and Bean sentenced him to two years in prison. Bean also ruled that Venables' new identity, which had been granted after he murdered James Bulger as a teenager, was not to be published; Bulger's family criticised this decision. He also presided over the murder trial of Saud bin Abdulaziz bin Nasser Al Saud, a member of the Saudi royal family, and over the trial of Asil Nadir for false accounting.

On 1 October 2014, Bean was appointed a Lord Justice of Appeal. He was appointed to the Privy Council in 2014. In August 2015, he was appointed Chairman of the Law Commission, succeeding Lord Justice Lloyd Jones.

On 4 November 2015 he was made an Honorary Fellow of The Academy of Experts in recognition of his contribution to The Academy's Judicial Committee and work for Expert Witnesses.

In January 2019 he became Treasurer of The Honourable Society of the Middle Temple.

Honours
On 8 April 1997, David Bean was appointed a Queen's Counsel. As a High Court judge, he received the customary knighthood as a Knight Bachelor and as a Lord Justice of Appeal he was appointed to the Privy Council.

References

1954 births
Living people
People educated at St Paul's School, London
Alumni of Trinity Hall, Cambridge
Members of the Middle Temple
Queen's Bench Division judges
Lords Justices of Appeal
Place of birth missing (living people)
20th-century King's Counsel
English King's Counsel
English barristers
Knights Bachelor
Members of the Privy Council of the United Kingdom
Presidents of the Cambridge Union
Chairs of the Fabian Society